This is a list of current and former artists that have recorded for Sire Records.

A

 Acid Test
 ADX
 Against Me!
 A House
 Marc Almond
 Aphex Twin (non-Europe)
 Alvarez Kings
 The Apples in Stereo
 Armageddon Dildos
 Armor for Sleep
 The Assembly
 Associates 
 The Avalanches
 Kevin Ayers
 Aztec Camera

B
 Ben Fields
 Baby Ford
 Barclay James Harvest
 Barenaked Ladies
 Mandy Barnett
 Bash & Pop
 Battle
 Nathan Beauregard
 Belly
 The Beatmasters
 Bigod 20
 Blancmange (US)
 Blondie
 Blu (rapper)
 B-Movie
 Body Count
 Betty Boo
 Book of Love
 Boney M (US)
 Boy George
 Bradford
 BRITTANYSAIDBYE
 Broadcast
 Julie Brown
 Bronx Style Bob
 Bruce Hornsby
 David Byrne

C

 Meryn Cadell
 John Cale
 Mississippi Joe Callicott
 Candye Kane
 Chiefs of Relief
 Chilliwack (US)
 Cleopatra
 Climax Blues Band
 The Cult (US)
 The Cure (US/Canada)
 Cold Fronts (US)
 Cyndi Lauper
 Cavetown

D

 Dadawa
 Dangerous Muse
 Data
 Craig David
 Michael Davidson
 Danielle Dax
 The Dead Boys
 Deadsy
 Delta Rae
 Depeche Mode (North America)
 The Deviants
 Digette
 Dinosaur Jr.
 Dissidenten (Germany)
 The Distillers
 DMZ
 Dolphin (band)
 Donald D
 Gail Ann Dorsey
 Doubleplusgood
 D:Ream
 D.R.U.G.S.
 Duncan Dhu

E

 Echo & the Bunnymen (US/Canada)
 Eisley
 The English Beat (US/Canada)
 Erasure (North America)
 Evermore
 Everything
 Everything But the Girl (US/Canada)
 Ewert and The Two Dragons

F

 Falco
 The Farm
 Figures on a Beach
 Flamin' Groovies
 Fleetwood Mac (US/Canada)
 Focus (US/Canada)
 Foxy Shazam
 The Futureheads

G

 Gallon Drunk
 Sophia George
 The Go-Betweens
 Martin L. Gore (North America)
 Laura Jane Grace
 The Greenberry Woods
 Gruppo Sportivo
 Guster

H

 Haddaway
 John Wesley Harding
 Jerry Harrison
 Corey Hart
 Harvey Danger
 Deborah Harry
 Annie Haslam (US/Canada)
 Ofra Haza (US)
 Richard Hell and the Voidoids
 Richard X. Heyman
 HIM
 The Hives (US)
 Kristin Hersh
 Hot Hot Heat
 Eric Hutchinson

I
 Ice-T

J
 Jack's Mannequin
 James
 Jolene
 The Judybats

K
 Kid Creole and the Coconuts
 Dee Dee King
 Kyary Pamyu Pamyu

L
 La Casa
 Laid Back
 k.d. lang
 Les Negresses Vertes
 Less Than Jake
 Furry Lewis
 Jerry Lee Lewis
 Lights
 The Lilys
 Larrikin Love
 Luna

M
 M (US and Canada)
 Madness (US)
 Madonna
 The Maine
 Mandy Moore
 Johnny Marr (US)
 Billie Ray Martin
 Martini Ranch
 Mastodon
 Matchbox
 Ian McCulloch 
 Meg & Dia
 Mêlée
 Men Without Hats
 The Mighty Lemon Drops
 Ministry
 Modern English (US)
 Mojave 3
 Morcheeba
 Morrissey (US)
 My Bloody Valentine
 My Chemical Romance
 Mystery Jets

N
 Nancy Boy
 Les Négresses Vertes
 Never Shout Never
 Nightmare of You
 Nick Kamen
 The Normal
 New Deal String Band
 The Nitecaps

O
 The Ocean Blue
 The Odds
 Omah Lay

P
 Tommy Page
 The Paley Brothers
 Paul Parker
 Pet Shop Boys (US)
 The Piranhas
 Plastic Bertrand
 Positive Noise
 Poster Children
 The Pretenders (US)
 Primal Scream
 Program 2
 Proper Grounds
 PRETTYMUCH

R
 Radio Birdman
 Ramones
 Recoil
 Red Box
 Lou Reed
 Renaissance (US/Canada/Germany)
 The Replacements
 Revolting Cocks
 The Rezillos
 Rheostatics
 Charlie Rich
 Jonathan Richman and the Modern Lovers
 Ride
 Jean Ritchie
 Riverside
 Rollerskate Skinny
 The Romantics
 Roof Doctor
 Royal Crescent Mob
 David Rudder
 Arthur Russell

S
 The Saints
 David Santo
 Ximena Sarinana
 Scorpio Rising
 Jimmy Scott
 Tim Scott
 Seal (US)
 The Searchers
 Sebadoh
 Secret Affair
 S'Express
 Sham 69
 Johnny Shines
 The Shys
 Silicon Teens
 Silversun Pickups (outside North America)
 Sister Double Happiness
.Six Said Red 
 The Smiths (US)
 Soft Cell (US)
 Soul Asylum
 Soup Dragons
 Spacehog
 Specimen
 Regina Spektor
 Spinnerette
 The Spill Canvas
 The Squares
 The Strangeloves
 The Subways

T
 Taking Back Sunday
 Talking Heads
 Serj Tankian
 Troy Tate
 Evan Taubenfeld
 Taxiride
 Tegan and Sara
 Telex
 Chris Thomas
 The Ready Set
 Throwing Muses
 Johnny Thunders
 Tin Tin
 Tom Tom Club
 Frank Tovey
 The Tragically Hip (outside Canada)
 Tripmaster Monkey
 Tuff Darts
 Two Minds Crack

U
 Ultramarine
 Uncle Tupelo
 The Undertones
 Underworld

V
 Martha Veléz
 The Velvet Underground
 The Von Bondies
 The Veronicas

W
 The Waltons
 Waterlillies
 Paul Westerberg
 Bukka White
 Wilco
 The Wild Swans
 Brian Wilson
 Robert Wilkins

Y
 Yaz (North America)

Soundtracks 
 A Rage in Harlem
 A Walk on the Moon
 Body of War
 Dick Tracy
 Drop-Dead Gorgeous
 Earth Girls are Easy
 Election
 Even Cowgirls Get the Blues
 The Family Man
 Fear No Evil
 (500) Days of Summer
 Naked in New York
 Rock 'n' Roll High School
 Shag: The Movie
 The SpongeBob SquarePants Movie
 Trespass
 True Stories
 Who's That Girl?
 Wigstock
 Wild Orchid

Sire Records